Nathan Constance (born 7 January 1979 in London) is an English actor and Voice Over Artist. He is best known for his work as a character performer in AAA Video Games, as handyman-turned-Prison Officer Josh Mitchell in prison drama series, Bad Girls, and as footballer Ian Walmsley in TV drama, Footballers Wives. Other films he is known for include Results (2013), Dog Eat Dog (2001), and Bonded by Blood (2010).

His top Credits include the role of Gorgutz 'Ead'unter in Warhammer 40,000: Dawn of War III, Marcus Graves in Titanfall and Adyr in Lords of the Fallen.

Filmography

Video games
 Killzone: Mercenary – Boris (2013)
 Titanfall – Vice Admiral Marcus Graves (2014)
 Lords of the Fallen – Adyr (2014)
 The Order: 1886 – Various (2015)
 Battlefield 1'' – Various (2016)
 Warhammer 40.000: Down of War III – Gorgutz "Ead"unter (2017)

References

External links

1979 births
Living people
English male television actors